Kostiantynivka is an selo in Bohodukhiv Raion of Kharkiv Oblast in Ukraine. Kostiantynivka belongs to Krasnokutsk settlement hromada, one of the hromadas of Ukraine.  Population: 

Until 18 July 2020, Kostiantynivka belonged to Krasnokutsk Raion. The raion was abolished in July 2020 as part of the administrative reform of Ukraine, which reduced the number of raions of Kharkiv Oblast to seven. The area of Krasnokutsk Raion was merged into Bohodukhiv Raion.

In 2021, Kostiantynivka had the status of urban-type settlement removed and became a selo.

Economy

Transportation
It is on the railway connecting Kharkiv and Poltava. There is some passenger traffic.

The settlement has access on the south, via Kolomak, to Highway M03 which connects Kharkiv with Kyiv, and on the west to Highway H12 connecting Poltava and Sumy.

References

Urban-type settlements in Bohodukhiv Raion
Bogodukhovsky Uyezd